Nathan E. Hickok (born 1839; date of death unknown) was an American soldier who fought in the American Civil War. Hickok received his country's highest award for bravery during combat, the Medal of Honor. Hickok's medal was won for his actions at the Battle of Chapin's Farm, on September 29, 1864. He was honored with the award on April 6, 1865.

Hickok was born in Danbury, Connecticut, where he entered service in the war and was buried.

Medal of Honor citation

See also
List of American Civil War Medal of Honor recipients: G–L

References

1839 births
Date of death unknown
Year of death unknown
American Civil War recipients of the Medal of Honor
People from Danbury, Connecticut
People of Connecticut in the American Civil War
Union Army officers
United States Army Medal of Honor recipients
Military personnel from Connecticut